Iridomyrmex obsidianus is a species of ant in the genus Iridomyrmex. Described by Emery in 1914, the species can only be found in New Caledonia.

References

Iridomyrmex
Insects of New Caledonia
Insects described in 1914